The 12th Pan American Games were held in Mar del Plata, Argentina from March 11 to March 26, 1995.

Medals

Bronze

Men's 4x400 metres: Robert Guy, Neil de Silva, Hayden Stephen, and Ian Morris

Men's Light Middleweight (– 71 kg): Kurt Sinette

Men's 1.000m Time Trial (Track): Gene Samuel

Men's – 50 kg: Sherland Flores
Women's – 51 kg: Cheryl Sankar

Results by event

See also
Trinidad and Tobago at the 1996 Summer Olympics

References
T&T Olympic Committee

Nations at the 1995 Pan American Games
P
1995